Hans-Werner Kraus (1 July 1915 – 25 May 1990) was a German U-boat commander in the Kriegsmarine of Nazi Germany. He was a recipient of the Knight's Cross of the Iron Cross.

He was on board the latter when it was attacked by Brazilian Air Force aircraft on 27 June 1943. Kraus evaded only to be targeted by a VP-74 Mariner (BuNo 6571) piloted by Lt. Harold C. Carey. The German crew shot it down and the crew were killed.

Kraus was sunk by aircraft off the coast of Brazil on 31 July 1943. Captured, he was sent as a POW to the United States. Kraus was one of the 25 POWs who escaped from Camp Papago Park, Arizona, during the night of 23–24 December 1944 but was recaptured.

Summary of career

Ships attacked 

* Sailing vessel
}}

Awards 
Wehrmacht Long Service Award 4th Class
U-boat War Badge (1939) (29 April 1940)
Medaglia di bronzo al Valore Militare (18 March 1942)
Iron Cross (1939)
2nd Class (8 July 1940)
1st Class (28 September 1940)
Knight's Cross of the Iron Cross on 19 June 1942 as Kapitänleutnant and commander of U-83
 Mentioned in the Wehrmachtbericht on 22 March 1942

References

Citations

Bibliography 

 
 
 

 
 
 Die Wehrmachtberichte 1939–1945 Band 2, 1. Januar 1942 bis 31. Dezember 1943. München: Deutscher Taschenbuch Verlag GmbH & Co. KG, 1985. .

1915 births
1990 deaths
U-boat commanders (Kriegsmarine)
Recipients of the Knight's Cross of the Iron Cross
Recipients of the Bronze Medal of Military Valor
German prisoners of war in World War II held by the United States
Reichsmarine personnel
Military personnel from Thuringia
People from Saalfeld